The 38th General Assembly of Prince Edward Island was in session from March 29, 1916, to June 26, 1919. The Conservative Party led by John Alexander Mathieson formed the government. Aubin-Edmond Arsenault succeeded Mathieson as Premier and party leader in 1917.

John S. Martin was elected speaker. Albert P. Prowse became speaker in 1918.

There were five sessions of the 38th General Assembly:

Members

Kings

Prince

Queens

Notes:

References
  Election results for the Prince Edward Island Legislative Assembly, 1915-09-16
 O'Handley, Kathryn Canadian Parliamentary Guide, 1994 

Terms of the General Assembly of Prince Edward Island
1916 establishments in Prince Edward Island
1919 disestablishments in Prince Edward Island